F300 or F.300 may refer to:

 Farman F.300, a 1930 French  airliner
 Ferrari F300, a 1998 Italian Formula One car